Giovanni Antonio Galderisi (1577–1658) was a Roman Catholic prelate who served as Bishop of Bovino (1616–1658).

Biography
Giovanni Antonio Galderisi was born in Monopoli, Italy in 1577.
On 11 January 1616, he was appointed during the papacy of Pope Paul V as Bishop of Bovino.
On 24 January 1616, he was consecrated bishop by Giovanni Garzia Mellini, Cardinal-Priest of Santi Quattro Coronati, with Lucio de Morra, Archbishop of Otranto, and Alessandro Guidiccioni (iuniore), Bishop of Lucca, serving as co-consecrators. 
He served as Bishop of Bovino until his death in 1658.

References 

17th-century Italian Roman Catholic bishops
Bishops appointed by Pope Paul V
1577 births
1658 deaths